Da l' je sve bilo samo fol? (trans. Was Everything just Pretending?) is the second live album by Serbian and former Yugoslav singer-songwriter Đorđe Balašević. The album was recorded during Balašević's concert in Maribor, Slovenia, on December 6, 1996, which was one of Balašević's second concert in this former Yugoslav republic after the breakup of Yugoslavia.

Track listing
"Neki novi klinci" – 5:38
"Govor I" – 3:14
"Slovenska" – 5:04
"Svirajte mi Jesen stiže dunjo moja" – 6:17
"Prva ljubav" – 5:59
"Devojka sa čardaš nogama" – 4:08
"Govor II" – 2:00
"Slabo divanim ..." – 4:20
"Menuet" – 6:03
"Provincijalka" – 4:54
"Ćaletova pesma" – 5:11
"Život je more" – 3:36
"Miholjsko leto" – 4:49
"Boža zvani Pub" – 3:07

Personnel
Đorđe Balašević – vocals
Đorđe Petrović – keyboard
Aleksandar Dujin – piano
Dušan Bezuha – guitar
Alekandar Kravić – bass guitar
Josip Kovač – violin, saxophone
Petar Radmilović – drums

References
 EX YU ROCK enciklopedija 1960–2006, Janjatović Petar;  

1997 live albums
Đorđe Balašević live albums